Big City Nights is the second studio album by the French-English recording artist Space Cowboy. It is the second full-length release by the artist and was released on 22 June 2005.

Track listing

Release history

Personnel
 Nicolas Dresti - Composer, Instrumentation, Mixing, Producer, Programming, Scratching, Vocals
 Matt Hughes - Drums
 Rosie Cole - Composer, Guest Appearance
 James Cruz - Mastering
 Lenny Kravitz - Composer
 Kele Le Roc - Guest Appearance
 George Miller - Technical Support

References

2005 albums
Space Cowboy (musician) albums